Jail Bait is a 1937 American short comedy film starring Buster Keaton.

Plot
Following a kidnapping and murder, a reporter believes he knows the identity of the murderer, so he asks his roommate, a newspaper boy, to confess to the crime, in order to throw the police off the actual murderer's trail – giving the reporter time to catch the murderer and claim the reward for himself. The newspaper boy is at first reluctant, but then agrees with the condition that his half of the reward be large enough to purchase a ring he wants. Having gotten himself arrested, the newspaper boy learns that his roommate's plane has crashed, killing him and leaving the newspaper boy trapped in a death sentence for a crime he did not commit.

Following a prison break, the newspaper boy finds himself in the hideout of the man, Sawed-off Madison, responsible for the crimes he falsely confessed to. A shoot-out ensues, allowing both the actual murderer and the newspaper boy to escape. Back at the police station it is discovered that the newspaper boy did not commit the murder, and the police know it was Madison. At this time, the newspaper boy carries Sawed-off Madison into the station and claims the reward for his capture. The newspaper boy buys the ring he wanted.

Cast
 Buster Keaton
 Harold Goodwin 
 Bud Jamison
 Matthew Betz
 Betty André
 Stanley Blystone as Arresting officer (uncredited)
 Bobby Burns as Warden (uncredited)
 Allan Cavan as Desk Sergeant (uncredited)
 Harry Tenbrook as Prison guard (uncredited)

See also
 Buster Keaton filmography

External links

 Jail Bait at the International Buster Keaton Society

1937 films
1937 comedy films
1937 short films
Educational Pictures short films
American black-and-white films
Films directed by Charles Lamont
American comedy short films
1930s American films
1930s English-language films
English-language comedy films